Dolna Mitropoliya Air Base is a public use airport near Dolna Mitropoliya, Pleven, Bulgaria. It is the home of the aviation faculty of the National Defence University. The 12th Air Training Wing is stationed there. The aviation school was created in 1945 and named after Georgi Benkovski. The school moved to Dolna Mitropoliya in 1948 and was incorporated in 2002 as part of the National Defence University.

See also
List of airports in Bulgaria

References

External links 
 Airport record for Dolna Mitropoliya Airport at Landings.com

Airports in Bulgaria
Pleven Province